Symphony No. 11 is the eleventh symphony by the American composer Philip Glass. The work was commissioned by the Bruckner Orchestra Linz, Istanbul International Music Festival and the Queensland Symphony Orchestra and premiered January 31, 2017, Glass's 80th birthday, with Dennis Russell Davies conducting the Bruckner Orchestra Linz at Carnegie Hall in New York City.

References

 11
Glass 11
2016 compositions
Compositions for symphony orchestra